Ponerorchis farreri is a species of flowering plant in the family Orchidaceae, native from south-east Tibet to south-central China (north-west Yunnan).

Taxonomy
The species was first described in 1924 by Rudolf Schlechter, as Amitostigma farreri. A molecular phylogenetic study in 2014 found that species of Amitostigma, Neottianthe and Ponerorchis were mixed together in a single clade, making none of the three genera monophyletic as then circumscribed. Amitostigma and Neottianthe were subsumed into Ponerorchis, with Amitostigma farreri becoming Ponerorchis farreri.

References

farreri
Orchids of Yunnan
Flora of Tibet
Plants described in 1924